The 1989 SMU Mustangs football team represented Southern Methodist University (SMU) as a member of the Southwest Conference (SWC) during the 1989 NCAA Division I-A football season. Led by first-year head coach Forrest Gregg, the Mustangs were returning to competition for the first time since 1986. An NCAA investigation into continued misconduct in the football program had resulted in the Mustangs receiving the "death penalty", which resulted in the 1987 season being cancelled and indirectly resulted in the team not having enough players to field a team in 1988. After playing most of the past several seasons at Texas Stadium, the Mustangs moved back to their old home of Ownby Stadium on campus, where they had not played since 1948.

The Mustangs recorded a record of 2-8, finishing last in the Southwest Conference where they failed to record a victory. Both of those wins came against opponents from the lower Division I-AA level, as SMU beat Connecticut and North Texas. The team allowed 499 points on defense and gave up 50 or more three times, including their game against conference rival Houston where they gave up 95.

"Ponygate"

Throughout the late 1970s and mid-1980s the SMU football program had been investigated and punished several times by the NCAA for recruiting violations. The most egregious violation was a slush fund to attract players to play for the SMU football team. The repeated violations resulted in the football program ultimately receiving the death penalty, with the NCAA's infractions committee voting unanimously to cancel the Mustangs' 1987 season and the team's four scheduled home games in 1988.

The team was placed on probation until 1990, was banned from bowl games until 1989, and could not be televised on national television until 1989. The program would lose 55 scholarships over 4 years and could only hire 5 assistant coaches instead of the usual 9. The program was also barred from off-campus recruiting until August 1988 and paid campus visits were forbidden until the 1988–89 school year. As a result of the penalties, the program granted a full release to every player on the roster that resulted in other universities recruiting SMU players.

On February 27, 1987, two days after the sanctions were announced, acting athletic director Dudley Parker stated he was unsure if the program could field a team for the 1988 season. Two months later, on April 11, university president William Stallcup formally cancelled the 1988 season, citing concerns over injuries to potential players and having to rely on a high number of walk-ons with only a few scholarship players remaining.

Return to football
Hall of Fame lineman and SMU alum Forrest Gregg was hired as the program's head coach in January 1988; at the time, Gregg was the head coach for the Green Bay Packers and resigned and took a pay cut for the SMU job. Gregg was personally asked to take the head coaching position by Stalcup. The first player Gregg recruited was quarterback Mike Romo from San Antonio.

Gregg and his staff had to rebuild the football program practically from scratch. By the time of the team's week one game against Rice, only one scholarship player, senior wide receiver Mitchell Gleiber, remained from the 1986 team. The Mustangs' week one roster consisted of 89 players, with 73 being freshmen, and 41 were on scholarship. The starting lineup against Rice consisted of 15 freshmen, two sophomores, and three seniors. In their first game since November 22, 1986, the Mustangs lost 35–6 to Rice; the Owls' victory snapped a 18 game losing streak.

Schedule

Personnel

Season summary

at Houston

SMU lost 95–21 to in-state rival Houston. The Cougars finished the game with 1,021 yards of offense, setting the record for most offensive yards in an NCAA game and the only time a team has gained 1,000 or more yards in a single game.

at Notre Dame

References

External links
1989 SMU Mustangs football roster

SMU
SMU Mustangs football seasons
SMU Mustangs football